Mor Dioscorus Kuriakose (born 11 May 1957) is  a Syriac Orthodox bishop, currently the Abbot of Malecuriz Dayro and Metropolitan of Simhasana Churches in North Kerala. Kuriakose belongs to the Ponnamkuzhy family, Arakunnam.

Education
Kuriakose graduated with B.A degree. He joined St.James Seminary, Perumpally for theological Studies and obtained Bachelor of Divinity Degree. Later he studied at Bangalore and obtained Masters in Theology(M.Th) from United Theological College, Bangalore of Serampore University.

References

Living people
Syriac Orthodox Church bishops
Indian Oriental Orthodox Christians
People from Ernakulam district
1957 births